Carl-Axel "Cacka" Christiernsson (7 January 1898 – 27 October 1969) was a Swedish hurdler who competed at the 1920 and 1924 Summer Olympics. In 1920 he finished fifth in the 400 m and sixth in the 110 m event. Four years later he placed fourth in the 110 m final.

Nationally Christiernsson won the Swedish hurdles titles over 110 m in 1920–22 and over 400 m in 1920–22 and 1924; he was also the English AAA champion in the 440 yards in 1921. In 1922–1926 he occasionally competed in the United States and set American indoor hurdles records over 60, 80 and 100 yards.

References

1898 births
1969 deaths
Swedish male hurdlers
Olympic athletes of Sweden
Athletes (track and field) at the 1920 Summer Olympics
Athletes (track and field) at the 1924 Summer Olympics
Athletes from Stockholm